Les mariés de la tour Eiffel (The Wedding Party on the Eiffel Tower) is a ballet to a libretto by Jean Cocteau, choreography by Jean Börlin, set by , costumes by Jean Hugo, and music by five members of Les Six: Georges Auric, Arthur Honegger, Darius Milhaud, Francis Poulenc and Germaine Tailleferre.  The score calls for two narrators. The ballet was first performed in Paris in 1921.

Background
The ballet had its genesis in a commission to Jean Cocteau and Georges Auric, from Rolf de Maré of the Ballets suédois.  Cocteau's original title for his scenario was The Wedding Party Massacre. It has been suggested that Raymond Radiguet, the young writer close to Cocteau at the time, made some contribution to the libretto.

Running short of time, Auric asked his fellow members of Les Six to also contribute music, and all of them did except Louis Durey, who pleaded illness.

It was staged by the Ballets suédois at the Théâtre des Champs-Élysées in Paris on 18 June 1921, the principal dancers being C. Ari, J. Figoni, and K. Vahlander.  The orchestra was conducted by Désiré-Émile Inghelbrecht.  The narrators were Jean Cocteau and Pierre Bertin.

It had a brief moment of fame and even scandal, but then fell into oblivion, although it was given in New York City in 1923. A new production opened there in 1988.

Story
The story of the ballet is somewhat nonsensical: 
 The new couple have a wedding breakfast on Bastille Day (July 14) at a table on one of the platforms of the famous tower. A guest makes a pompous speech. When a humpbacked photographer bids everyone to "watch the birdie," it appears that a telegraph office suddenly springs into existence on the platform. A lion comes in and eats one of the guests for breakfast and a strange figure called "a child of the future" appears and kills everybody.  Nevertheless, the ballet concludes with the end of the wedding.

When asked what the ballet was about, Cocteau replied: "Sunday vacuity; human beastliness, ready-made expressions, disassociation of ideas from flesh and bone, ferocity of childhood, the miraculous poetry of everyday life."

On 29 July 1923, in a letter, Francis Poulenc described the work as "toujours de la merde ... hormis l'Ouverture d'Auric" ("yet more shit ... apart from Auric's Overture").

The ballet
The sections of the ballet are: 
 Overture (14 July) - Georges Auric
 Marche nuptiale - Darius Milhaud
 Discours du General (Polka) – Francis Poulenc
 La Baigneuse de Trouville – Poulenc
 La Fugue du Massacre – Milhaud
 La Valse des Depeches – Germaine Tailleferre
 Marche funèbre – Arthur Honegger (in which he quotes the Waltz from Gounod's Faust)
 Quadrille – Tailleferre
 Ritournelles – Auric
 Sortie de la Noce – Milhaud.

Recordings
The score was unpublished until the first full recording of the work in 1966, which was supervised by Darius Milhaud.

Les Mariés was performed by the Delft student music company "Krashna Musika" in Delft, the Netherlands, on 2 May 1975, as part of the Student Music Festival "Muzikaal Totaal", conceived by Guus Ranke. It was repeated on 23 May 1975, in theatre "De Junushof" in Wageningen, The Netherlands. Both performances were in Dutch. The Wageningen edition was recorded, and can be obtained via Krashna Musika / KRAK from June 2020 on.

The ballet has also been recorded more recently by the Philharmonia Orchestra under Geoffrey Simon.

In 1987, Marius Constant arranged the music for an ensemble of fifteen instruments: wind quintet, string quintet, trumpet, trombone, harp and two percussion.  This version of the music has been recorded by the Erwartung Ensemble under Bernard Desgraupes, with Jean-Pierre Aumont and Raymond Gerome, narrators.

References

External links
Video - Darius Milhaud - Les mariés de la tour Eiffel (20:51).

Collaborations in classical music
1921 ballet premieres
1921 compositions
Compositions with a narrator
Ballets by Georges Auric
Ballets by Darius Milhaud
Ballets by Francis Poulenc
Compositions by Arthur Honegger
Compositions by Germaine Tailleferre
Les Six
Ballets by Jean Börlin